The Großer Knollen (also the Groß Knollen; colloquially referred to as the Knollen, historically the Grosze Knolle) is a  mountain in the southwestern part of the Harz in Lower Saxony, Germany.

Geography 
The Großer Knollen is located northeast of Herzberg am Harz and Scharzfeld, northwest of Bad Lauterberg im Harz and south of the hamlet of Sieber. It is surrounded by several other mountains and hills that range in height between 550 and 650 m above mean sea level. Just under 1 km away to the southwest the Kleiner Knollen rises to a height of 631 m.

Geology 
The Großer Knollen is a porphyritic volcano. When climbing the mountain walkers can see to the side of the path in places the reddish colouring in the rock that is due to the volcanic rock, porphyry. About 800 metres east of the Großer Knollen is the Knollengrube ("Knollen Pit"), in which iron ore was mined in 1925.

Observation tower 
From the roughly 20 m high observation tower, which stands next to the inn on the summit of the Großer Knollen, there is a view not only over the mountain peaks of the Harz, but also southwards to the Rotenberg and Eichsfeld. In good conditions visitors can even see as far as the Thuringian Forest to the south.

Walking 
Numerous walking trails radiate from the summit, including paths to Bad Lauterberg, Herzberg, Scharzfeld, Sieber and Sankt Andreasberg. The roughly 12 km long path to Sankt Andreasberg runs over a crest over 600 m high with many wonderful views.

The Großer Knollen is checkpoint no. 150 in the Harzer Wandernadel walking trail network.

Forest 
Today the lower flanks of the Großer Knollen are mainly covered by beech, but some spruce also grows in higher areas. In 1596 it was entirely covered in beech woods, in 1630 there were also some sycamores.

See also
 List of mountains and hills of Lower Saxony

Sources 
 Topographic map 1:25,000 series, No. 4328 Bad Lauterberg im Harz
 Topographic map 1:25,000 series, No. 4228 Riefensbeek (to determine the isolation and prominence)

References

External links 

 Information about the Großer Knollen
 Information on the Knollengrube pit

Mountains of Lower Saxony
Mountains of the Harz
Osterode (district)